Zeffiro Furiassi (19 January 1923 – 4 November 1974) was an Italian footballer who played as a defender.

Club career
Furiasso was born in Pesaro. Playing for Fiorentina and Lazio, he played eight seasons as a starter and racked up 239 appearances in Serie A without ever scoring a goal.

International career
With the Italian national team, Furiassi played both games at the 1950 World Cup, which were his only two appearances for the national team.

References

External links
 
 

1923 births
1974 deaths
People from Pesaro
Italian footballers
Association football defenders
ACF Fiorentina players
S.S. Lazio players
Serie A players
Italy international footballers
1950 FIFA World Cup players
Vis Pesaro dal 1898 players
Italy B international footballers
A.S.D. La Biellese players
Sportspeople from the Province of Pesaro and Urbino
Footballers from Marche